The Bantu Authorities Act, 1951 (Act No. 68 of 1951; subsequently renamed the Black Authorities Act, 1951) was to give authority to Traditional Tribal Leader within their traditional tribal homelands in South Africa. This legislation, succeeding the Native Affairs Act (Act No. 23 of 1920), created the legal basis for Self Determination of the various ethnic and linguistic tribes into traditional homeland reserve areas and established tribal, regional and territorial authorities. This Act was augmented by the Bantu Homelands Citizens Act of 1970.

The law established a basis for ethnic government in African homeland reserve areas.  All political rights (including voting) held by Africans were restricted to the designated homeland.

Many years after the end of apartheid, and with a new framework for traditional leadership present in South African governance, the act became obsolete, and it was formally repealed in 2010, 59 years after it was enacted

See also
 Apartheid in South Africa

References

Apartheid laws in South Africa
1951 in South African law